Lophosoria is a genus of tree ferns within the family Dicksoniaceae.

Although it is confined to tropical America in modern times, there is fossil evidence that it was once spread throughout Gondwana with the exception of New Zealand.

Species

References
 (2004): Tree Ferns 

Dicksoniaceae
Fern genera
Neotropical realm flora